Song Xiaoqun (born August 22, 1977 in Shengzhou, Zhejiang) is a female Chinese sports sailor who competed for Team China at the 2008 Summer Olympics.

Major performances
1999/2000/2002/2003/2004/2005 National Championships - 1st 470 class;
2008 Rolex Miami OCR - 8th Yngling class;
2008 Palma Princess Sofia Regatta - 4th Yngling class

References

 http://2008teamchina.olympic.cn/index.php/personview/personsen/1787

1977 births
Living people
Chinese female sailors (sport)
Olympic sailors of China
Sportspeople from Shaoxing
Sailors at the 2008 Summer Olympics – Yngling
Medalists at the 2002 Asian Games
Sailors at the 2002 Asian Games
Asian Games gold medalists for China
Asian Games medalists in sailing
People from Shengzhou
21st-century Chinese women